Janine Alm Ericson (born 31 October 1973) is a Swedish politician.  she serves as Member of the Riksdag. She represented the constituency of Västra Götaland County North in her first term and, as of 2018, she represents the constituency of Västra Götaland County West. She is affiliated with the Green Party.

She was also elected as Member of the Riksdag in September 2022.

References

External links 
 

Living people
1973 births
Place of birth missing (living people)
21st-century Swedish politicians
21st-century Swedish women politicians
Members of the Riksdag 2014–2018
Members of the Riksdag 2018–2022
Members of the Riksdag 2022–2026
Members of the Riksdag from the Green Party
Women members of the Riksdag